Jesús Jiménez may refer to:

 Jesús Jiménez (boxer) (born 1984), Mexican boxer
 Jesús Jiménez (footballer) (born 1993), Spanish footballer
 Jesús Jiménez Barbero (born 1960), Spanish scientist
 Jesús Jiménez Zamora (1823–1897), President of Costa Rica